Pilot Point is a city in Denton County, Texas, United States. Its population was 3,856 at the 2010 census, increasing to 4,381 at the 2020 census.

Geography

Pilot Point is located at  (33.396350, –96.958719).

The climate in this area is characterized by hot, humid summers and generally mild to cool winters. According to the Köppen climate classification, Pilot Point has a humid subtropical climate, Cfa on climate maps.

Demographics

As of the 2020 United States census, there were 4,381 people, 1,591 households, and 901 families residing in the city.

Government
The city is governed by an elected council. A separately elected mayor presides over the governing body and also may cast a vote on matters before the council.  The city does not currently have a mayor, following Mayor McIlravy's arrest on June 21, 2022, although the Mayor Pro Tempore will be sworn in as mayor soon. Council members and the mayor serve without any compensation pursuant to a Home Rule Charter that was approved by voters in 2009. An appointed city manager oversees daily operations of various city services and functions. Elections each May determine occupants of alternating seats on the council and the mayor is elected biannually.

Notable people

 Frederick Edgar Ferguson, Medal of Honor recipient, born in Pilot Point
 Colt Knost, PGA golfer, grew up in Pilot Point, state champion in 2003
 G.A. Moore, Texas High School Football coach, member of the University of North Texas Athletic Hall of Fame and the Texas Sports Hall of Fame
 Thomas Ambrose Tschoepe, Roman Catholic bishop, born in Pilot Point

Education
The city is served by the Pilot Point Independent School District.

References

External links
 City of Pilot Point official website
 Lisa C. Maxwell, "PILOT POINT, TX," Handbook of Texas Online (https://tshaonline.org/handbook/online/articles/hgp04), accessed May 28, 2011. Published by the Texas State Historical Association.

Dallas–Fort Worth metroplex
Cities in Denton County, Texas
Cities in Texas
Butterfield Overland Mail in Texas